Angelo Vier (born 23 April 1972) is a German former professional footballer who played as a striker. He is the sporting director of BFC Dynamo.

Career
Vier spent one season in the Bundesliga with SV Werder Bremen.

Post-playing career
Following his retirement Vier worked as a player agent and as a consultant to BFC Dynamo.

In August 2017, Vier was announced as the sporting director of FC Ingolstadt 04, succeeding Thomas Linke. He signed a two-year contract with the 2. Bundesliga club.

Honours
 2. Bundesliga top scorer: 1997 with Rot-Weiss Essen, 1998 with FC Gütersloh

References

1972 births
Living people
People from East Berlin
Association football forwards
German footballers
East German footballers
German expatriate footballers
FC Gueugnon players
SAS Épinal players
SC Verl players
SV Werder Bremen players
Arminia Bielefeld players
Rot-Weiss Essen players
SK Rapid Wien players
Rot-Weiß Oberhausen players
VfL Osnabrück players
FC Gütersloh 2000 players
Ligue 2 players
Footballers from Berlin
Bundesliga players
2. Bundesliga players
Austrian Football Bundesliga players
Expatriate footballers in France
Expatriate footballers in Austria